Cecimonster vs Donka is a Peruvian rock band formed on May 1, 2010, by Sergio Saba and Sebastian Kouri in Lima, Peru. A few months later they were joined by Elías Mujica and Patrick Mitchell. Later that year, Elías left the band for Alonso García to take on bass guitar duties. On May 20, 2011, they released their debut album Solara via CD and digital download. The following year on August 1, their sophomore album, titled Adentro Afuera, was released again on both CD and digital download formats.

In 2012, they were nominated for the best rock act in the country by El Comercio. In 2013 they went on hiatus to regroup seven months later with Sandro Labenita on drums and Elías Mujica on bass guitar.

On 2014 Alonso García returned on bass and they recorded their third album titled Empty Beaches released by Anti-Rudo records.

In 2019 the band entered the studio with Mario Acuna and Danny Wilson  and recorded one B-Side "Hombros Descompuestos" and their latest album "A Big House By The Lake" which they promoted via a mini documentary.

They have shared stages with important musicians such as Pixies, Title Fight, Japandroids, Julian Casablancas, Boom Boom Kid, The Joy Formidable and Placebo.

The band's style of music contains a range of elements, including indie rock, post rock, punk rock, emo, and post hardcore.

Discography 

 Solara (2011)
 Adentro Afuera (2012)
Empty Beaches (2015)
A Big House by the Lake (2019)

Timeline

Music videos

 Inyecten (2011)
 Watch Me (2011)
 Nieve Nieve (2012)
 One Hundred Years (2012)
 Cecimonster vs Donka @ Colors Night Lights Music Summer 2014 (2014)
 Not Your Friend (2015)
 Monday (2015)
 Night Flight To MIA (2019)

Documentaries 

 Cecimonster vs Donka @ Audiofobia
 Minus The Breakables London Summer Tour 2011 (teaser)

References

External links 

Peruvian alternative rock groups
Musical groups established in 2010
2010 establishments in Peru